Greenstein  may refer to:

 4612 Greenstein, a main-belt asteroid
 Greenstein (surname), a German surname